Mud minnow may refer to:

 Galaxiella munda, known as Western mud minnow
 Lepidogalaxias salamandroides, common name Shannon mudminnow
 species of fish of the family Umbridae
 Central mudminnow
 Eastern mudminnow
 European mudminnow
 Mummichog (Fundulus heteroclitus), or mud minnows, a small killifish